Southern Star Amphitheatre  was an amphitheatre located at AstroWorld in Houston, Texas. It opened in the southeast corner of the theme park in 1980. The venue was frequented by notable performers including The Beach Boys and Kansas. The Southern Star saw a decline in the number of top-billed acts when the Cynthia Woods Mitchell Pavilion opened in 1990. Reserved seating was available and a grassy lawn was provided to guests with general admission. The venue closed along with the theme park in 2005.

Concerts

 Source A is: http://www.rockinhouston.com/venues/astroworld-southern-star/604/
 Source B is: http://www.setlist.fm/venue/astroworld-houston-tx-usa-3bd6d840.html

References

1980 establishments in Texas
2005 disestablishments in Texas
Amphitheaters in Texas
Former music venues in the United States
Music venues in Houston
Six Flags AstroWorld